Russo's New York Pizzeria is based in Houston, Texas and was established in 1992 by Anthony Russo. The chain serves New York-style pizza as well as several different types of Italian cuisine to include: soups, salads, pastas, calzones and dessert. The company's motto is "If it isn't fresh, don’t serve it," and has over 50 locations both domestic and international.    International locations are open in Dubai, Abu Dhabi and Sharjah, UAE.

All locations offer dine-in, takeout, delivery and catering.

History 
Chef Anthony Russo is the son of first-generation Italian immigrants and grew up in New Jersey. Anthony as his family moved to Galveston, Texas, in 1978. His father opened Russo’s Italian Restaurant, an Anthony began working in the restaurant kitchen. By the age of 12, he was learning family recipes from relatives who flew in from Naples and Sicily each summer. Since launching in 1990 in Houston, franchise locations have opened nationwide and the company expanded internationally.

Recognition and Awards 
 2019 top food franchises of 2019 in United States by Entrepreneur Magazine
 2018 Pizza Today's "Top 100 Pizza Companies"
 2017 Best Pizza Houston by Houstonia
 2013 Inc. 500's Fastest Growing Companies – #4180
 2012 Inc. 500's Fastest Growing Companies – #2715
 2012 Pizza Marketplace Magazine's "Top 100 Pizza Companies"
 2012 Pizza Today's "Top 100 Pizza Companies"
 2011 Inc. 500's Fastest Growing Companies – #3463
 2011 Entrepreneur Magazine's Top Restaurant Franchises
 2010 feature in ‘Every Day with Rachael Ray’ Magazine as one of the best pizzas in the United States
 2009 best Calzone in Dallas by D*Magazine
 2009 top 120 restaurants in United States by Entrepreneur Magazine
 2008 Best Pizza Houston by Houston Press

Corporate, Franchise and International Locations 
Russo's New York Pizzeria & Italian Kitchen corporate headquarters are located in Houston, Texas which supports both corporate and franchise locations, with over 50 franchise locations nationwide and expanding internationally in Dubai, UAE,  Bahrain, Qatar and Saudi Arabia.

See also
 List of pizza chains of the United States

References

External links 
 nypizzeria.com

Neapolitan cuisine
Pizza chains of the United States
Pizza franchises
Pizzerias in the United States
Restaurants in Arkansas
Restaurants in Florida
Restaurants in Tennessee
Restaurants in Houston
Restaurants established in 1992
Sicilian-American cuisine
1992 establishments in Texas